Stanley Cowell (May 5, 1941 – December 17, 2020) was an American jazz pianist and co-founder of the Strata-East Records label.

Early life

Cowell was born in Toledo, Ohio. He began playing the piano around the age of four, and became interested in jazz after seeing Art Tatum at the age of six. Tatum was a family friend.

After high school, Cowell studied classical piano with Emil Danenberg at Oberlin Conservatory of Music   He included "Emil Danenberg" in his 1973 suite "Musa: Ancestral Dreams". During his time at Oberlin, he played with jazz multi-instrumentalist Roland Kirk, which proved to be formative. He went on to receive a graduate degree in classical piano from the University of Michigan. He moved to New York in the mid-1960s.

Later life and career
Cowell played with Marion Brown, Max Roach, Bobby Hutcherson, Clifford Jordan, Harold Land, Sonny Rollins and Stan Getz. Cowell played with trumpeter Charles Moore and others in the Detroit Artist's Workshop Jazz Ensemble in 1965–66.

In 1971, Cowell co-founded the record label Strata-East with trumpeter Charles Tolliver. The label would become one of the most successful Black-led, independent labels of its day.

During the late 1980s, Cowell was part of a regular quartet led by J.J. Johnson. Cowell taught in the Music Department of the Mason Gross School of the Arts at Rutgers University in New Jersey.

On December 17, 2020, Cowell died at Bayhealth Hospital in Dover, Delaware, from hypovolemic shock. He was 79 years old.

Discography

As leader

As sideman
With Rashied Ali
First Time Out: Live at Slugs 1967 (Survival Records, 2020)
With Gary Bartz
Another Earth (Milestone, 1969)
With Marion Brown
Three for Shepp (Impulse!, 1967)
Why Not? (1968)
Vista (Impulse!, 1975)
With Larry Coryell
Equipoise (Muse, 1985)
Toku Do (Muse, 1987)
With Richard Davis
Way Out West (Muse, 1977 [1980])
Fancy Free (Galaxy)
With Sonny Fortune
Long Before Our Mothers Cried (Strata-East, 1974)
With Roy Haynes
Thank You Thank You (Galaxy, 1977)
Vistalite (Galaxy, 1977 [1979])
With Jimmy Heath
Love and Understanding (Muse, 1973)
The Time and the Place (Landmark, 1974 [1994])
With The Heath Brothers
Marchin' On (1975)
Passing Thru (1978)
In Motion (1979)
Live at the Public Theater (1980)
Expressions of Life (1980)
Brotherly Love (1982)
Brothers and Others (1984)
With Stan Getz
The Song Is You (1969)
With Johnny Griffin
Birds and Ballads (1978)
With Bobby Hutcherson
Patterns (Blue Note, 1968)
Spiral (Blue Note, 1968 [1979])
Medina (Blue Note, 1969 [1980])
Now! (Blue Note, 1969)
With J.J. Johnson
Standards-Live At The Village Vanguard (1988)
With Clifford Jordan
Glass Bead Games (1973)
With James Mtume
Rebirth Cycle (1977)
With Oliver Nelson
Swiss Suite (Flying Dutchman, 1971)
With Jimmy Owens
Headin' Home (A&M/Horizon, 1978)
With Art Pepper
Art Pepper Today (Galaxy, 1978)
Winter Moon (Galaxy, 1980)
One September Afternoon (Galaxy, 1980)
With Max Roach
Members, Don't Git Weary (Atlantic, 1968)
With Charles Sullivan
Genesis (Strata-East, 1974)
With Buddy Terry
Awareness (Mainstream, 1971)
With Charles Tolliver
The Ringer (Polydor, 1969)
Live at Slugs' (Strata-East, 1970)
Music Inc. (Strata-East, 1971)
Impact (Enja, 1972)
Live in Tokyo (Strata-East, 1973)
Impact (Strata-East, 1975)

References

External links 
Rutgers U site
 

1941 births
2020 deaths
African-American pianists
American jazz pianists
American male pianists
Hard bop pianists
Musicians from Toledo, Ohio
Strata-East Records artists
DIW Records artists
SteepleChase Records artists
Arista Records artists
ECM Records artists
Galaxy Records artists
20th-century American pianists
University of Michigan School of Music, Theatre & Dance alumni
Jazz musicians from Ohio
21st-century American pianists
20th-century American male musicians
21st-century American male musicians
American male jazz musicians
Heath Brothers members
Oberlin Conservatory of Music alumni
Rutgers University faculty
21st-century African-American musicians